The Warning is a Mexican rock band from Monterrey, Nuevo León, formed in 2013 by the Villarreal Vélez sisters: Daniela (guitar, lead vocals, piano), Paulina (drums, lead and backing vocals, piano), and Alejandra (bass guitar, piano, backing vocals). Their most recent album Error was released in June 2022.

History

Early years 
The Villarreal Vélez sisters were raised in Monterrey, and all received training on various instruments at an early age. At some point in their childhood, Daniela and Paulina had selected guitar and drums as their primary instruments, respectively. When the youngest of the three, Alejandra, selected bass guitar as her primary instrument at about age 7, the sisters decided to form a rock power trio. They learned to play rock songs, often via the Rock Band video game series, and posted videos of their performances to YouTube. 

In 2014, 12-year-old Paulina was profiled in the women's drumming publication Tom Tom Magazine. The band first gained widespread notice later in 2014 when, at ages 9 through 14, their YouTube video in which they performed Metallica's "Enter Sandman" went viral among rock music fans, eventually earning more than 20 million views. The video received attention from Metallica guitarist Kirk Hammett, who offered particular praise for Paulina, saying "The drummer kicks maximum ass!"

As independent artists (2015–2020) 
Due to notice gained by their "Enter Sandman" video, The Warning decided to seek a record deal and develop their own songs. They raised money through a successful GoFundMe appeal to record the six-song EP Escape the Mind, which was released in 2015. During production of the EP, the band met producer Jake Carmona, who went on to contribute to Escape the Mind and their next three albums. In April 2015, the band appeared on The Ellen DeGeneres Show. During this period the sisters raised funds, including a donation from DeGeneres and the Target Corporation, to attend a five-week training program at Berklee College of Music in the United States. 

They also gave two presentations at the TEDx conference at the University of Nevada in 2016 and 2017. The band was known for practicing with the Rock Band video game series early in their history; designers returned the favor by including several songs by The Warning in various editions of the series released during this period. 

The Warning's first full-length album, XXI Century Blood, was released in 2017. During this period they were invited to perform at the Mother of All Rock Festival in Monterrey, and also opened a show for The Killers in that city. Their second album Queen of the Murder Scene was released in November 2018. They announced an extensive upcoming tour throughout North America in late 2019, though it was canceled due to the COVID-19 pandemic.

With Lava Records (2020–present)
In August 2020, The Warning signed a five-album deal with Lava Records, and began work on a new album with producer David Bendeth. The song "Choke" was released in May 2021. Later that year, The Warning appeared on the Metallica tribute album The Metallica Blacklist, performing another cover of "Enter Sandman", this time with singer Alessia Cara. The six-song EP Mayday was released in October 2021, and The Warning embarked on a tour of North America in early 2022, performing more than 30 dates as headliners plus opening for Foo Fighters, Sammy Hagar and the Circle, and Stone Temple Pilots. They released the single "Money" in March 2022, and the song reached no. 31 on the Billboard Mainstream Rock Airplay chart. The full-length album Error, comprising the six tracks from the Mayday EP plus "Money" and seven new songs, was released in June 2022. In July 2022, they embarked on a U.S. tour supporting Halestorm and The Pretty Reckless and appearing at festivals like Burlington's Sound of Music Festival, Iceberg Alley, Summerfest, and Upheaval, before resuming their headlining tour in August 2022. In the Fall 2022, The Warning performed at additional festivals (Louder Than Life, Aftershock, Peninsula Tecate, Rock al Parque), supported a second US tour with Halestorm, a Canada tour with Three Days Grace, a Guns N' Roses tour stop in their home city of Monterrey, Mexico, and performed small-venue concerts in Las Vegas, California, and Lima, Peru.

Band members

 Daniela "Dany" Villarreal Vélez (born January 30, 2000) – guitars, lead vocals, piano (2013–present)
 Paulina "Pau" Villarreal Vélez (born February 5, 2002) – drums, lead and backing vocals, piano (2013–present)
 Alejandra "Ale" Villarreal Vélez (born December 13, 2004) – bass, backing vocals, piano (2013–present)

Discography

Studio albums
 XXI Century Blood (2017)
 Queen of the Murder Scene (2018)
 Error (2022)

EPs
 Escape the Mind (2015)
 Mayday (2021)

Singles

Music videos

Awards

|-
! scope="row" | 2019
| Independent Music Awards
| Rock / Hard Rock
| Queen of the Murder Scene
| 
|

References

External links

 

2013 establishments in Mexico
Child musical groups
Mexican rock music groups
Musical groups established in 2013
Musical groups from Monterrey
Family musical groups
Sibling musical trios
All-female bands